The Innocence Files is a 2020 American true crime documentary miniseries about wrongful convictions, and how they can affect the lives of the involved. The series is based upon the work of the Innocence Project, which is committed to exonerating individuals who it believes to have been wrongfully convicted.

Cast 
 Peter Neufeld
 Barry Scheck
 Michael West
 Gary Wells
 Levon Brooks
 Kennedy Brewer
 Adam Freeman
 Richard Souviron
 Gloria Williams

Release and Critical reception
The Innocence Files was released on April 15, 2020 on Netflix. The critical aggregator Metacritic awarded The Innocence Files a score of 86, indicating "universal acclaim".

References

External links
 
 

2020 American television series debuts
2020 American television series endings
2020s American documentary television series
English-language Netflix original programming
Netflix original documentary television series
Documentary television series about crime in the United States
Innocence Project